Uttershill Castle is a ruinous 16th-century tower house, about  south of Penicuik, Midlothian, Scotland, south of the river North Esk, and west of the Black Burn.
Alternative names are Utters Hill and Outtershill Castle.

History
The property belonged to the Prestons of Gorton and Craigmillar.  In 1646 the Countess of Eglinton lived here.  It was purchased by the Clerks of Penicuik in 1702.  The castle was a ruin prior to the start of the 19th century, although it was used as a gunpowder store.

The excavation was carried out in October 1994, in advance of a proposed restoration programme.

Structure
The castle had two storeys or more, and may have had a courtyard.  It had a vaulted basement, and a hall on the first storey, reached by a straight stair.  In the 17th century an unvaulted kitchen, with a chamber above, was added, but it has long since been demolished.  
The castle was built of freestone rubble, and was probably harled.
The entrance was at ground level on the south side.

See also
Castles in Great Britain and Ireland
List of castles in Scotland

References

Castles in Midlothian